"Why Can't You Love Me?" is a song recorded by South Korean singer Wendy. The song was released on April 5, 2021, by SM Entertainment for her first extended play, Like Water. Composed by Jamie Jones, Matt Wong, Paulina Cerrilla, Lamont Neuble, and Tim Stewart, and written by Koo Tae-woo, it is an medium R&B pop song that expresses the excitement of unrequited love. It debuted at 200 on South Korea's Gaon Digital Chart.

Composition 
"Why Can't You Love Me?" was composed by Jamie Jones, Matt Wong, Paulina Cerrilla, Lamont Neuble, and Tim Stewart and was written by Koo Tae-woo. Wendy revealed that the song is "quite difficult and requires a lot of singing skills". Musically, the track was described as a medium R&B pop song. Ruby C of NME described the track as an '80s soul-influenced' song with hints from upbeat version of Annie Lennox's "A Whiter Shade Of Pale". Wendy described the track for being the "brightest" on the album. It is composed in the key of F minor with a tempo of 81 beats per minute. Lyrically, the song expresses the excitement of unrequited love.

Promotion and reception 
Following its initial release, "Why Can't You Love Me?" was met with positive reviews from music critics. JT Early of Beats Per Minute described the song as "unabashedly romantic", further praising its "incredibly cute and the type of wholesome pop that always feels absent from the music landscape". Erin Han of Idology called the track as it is "filled with excitement and loveliness in harmony with rhythmical band performances and vocals". Ruby C of NME described the song as "bright, cheerful sounding" track further noting the song for Wendy's "uniquely enunciated words and melismatic riffs, even rounding it off with a vocal run that slightly mirrors the late Whitney Houston's hit "I Will Always Love You".

"Why Can't You Love Me?" debuted at number 200 on the 15th weekly issue of South Korea's Gaon Digital Chart for 2021 during the period dated April 4–10. In addition, it also debuted at number 33 on Gaon Download Chart.

Credits and personnel 
Credits adapted from the liner notes of Like Water.

Studio

 Recorded at SM Blue Cup Studio
 Engineered for mix at SM Lvyin Studio
 Mixed at SM Concert Hall Studio
 Mastered at 821 Sound Mastering

Personnel

 Wendyvocals, background vocals
Koo Tae-woosongwriting
Jamie Jonesoriginal writer, composition, arrangement
Matt Wongoriginal writer, composition, arrangement
Paulina Cerrillaoriginal writer, composition, arrangement
Lamont Neubleoriginal writer, composition, arrangement
Tim Stewartoriginal writer, composition, arrangement
ButterFlyvocal director, Pro Tools operator
Jung Eui-seokrecording
Lee Ji-hongmixing engineer
Namgoong Jinmixing
Kwon Nam-woomastering

Charts

Release history

References 

2021 songs
Wendy (singer) songs